Brusnica is a Slavic toponym, meaning "lingonberry" or "cowberry" (Vaccinium vitis-idaea). It may refer to:

Brusnica, Slovakia
Brusnica, Lopare, Bosnia and Herzegovina
Brusnica, Maglaj, Bosnia and Herzegovina
Brusnica, Gornji Milanovac, Serbia
Brusnica Velika, Bosnia and Herzegovina
Brusnica Mala, Bosnia and Herzegovina

See also
Brusnik (disambiguation)
Brusnice

Serbo-Croatian place names